The third series of RuPaul's Drag Race UK began airing on 23 September 2021.

The cast of the third series was officially announced on 18 August 2021 on social media. The series saw the return of Veronica Green, who was forced to withdraw from the second series of the show after testing positive for COVID-19, and received an open invitation for the third series. The series also welcomed Victoria Scone, the franchise's first ever cisgender female contestant since its beginning in 2009.

The winner of the third series of RuPaul's Drag Race UK was Krystal Versace, with Ella Vaday and Kitty Scott-Claus as the runners-up.

Production
In November 2020, BBC confirmed plans to air a third series, and casting closed the same month. The series was filmed in March 2021, in Manchester.

BBC Three shared a seven-second teaser for the series on social media on 21 June 2021.

Contestants 

Ages, names, and cities stated are at time of filming.

Contestant progress

Lip syncs
Legend:

Guest judges
Listed in chronological order:

Matt Lucas, actor and comedian
Oti Mabuse, dancer
Nicola Coughlan, actress
Emma Bunton, singer
Leigh-Anne Pinnock, singer
Lulu, singer
Alesha Dixon, singer
Russell Tovey, actor
Kathy Burke, actress and comedian

Special guests
Guests who appeared in episodes, but did not judge on the main stage.

Episode 3
Raven, runner-up on both RuPaul's Drag Race Season 2 and All Stars Season 1

Episode 4
Ian Masterson, producer and songwriter
Claire Richards, member of Steps
Lee Latchford-Evans, member of Steps
Ian "H" Watkins, member of Steps
Faye Tozer, member of Steps

Episode 6
 Judi Love, stand-up comedian
 Nadine Coyle, singer

Episode 7
Charity Shop Sue, YouTube personality

Episode 10
Jay Revell, choreographer

Episodes

References

2021 British television seasons
2021 in LGBT history
RuPaul's Drag Race UK seasons